Garlin Gilchrist II (born September 25, 1982) is an American politician and activist serving as the 64th lieutenant governor of Michigan since 2019. He is a member of the Democratic Party.

Early life and education
Gilchrist was born in Detroit. In 1982, his family moved to Farmington, Michigan. His mother worked at General Motors for 32 years and his father worked in defense contract management for the United States Department of Defense. 

Gilchrist earned a Bachelor of Science in Engineering with majors in computer science and computer engineering from the University of Michigan in 2005.

Career 
Gilchrist moved to Redmond, Washington, and worked for Microsoft for four years as a software engineer, where he helped build SharePoint. Next, Gilchrist worked as a community organizer and director of new media for the Center for Community Change, now known as Community Change. Later, Gilchrist worked for MoveOn.org in Washington, D.C., as national campaign director.

In July 2014, Gilchrist moved back to Detroit, working for the city government under chief information officer Beth Niblock as director of innovation and emerging technology.  He created the Improve Detroit smartphone app that allows residents to report issues for the city to address. He served as founding executive director of the Center for Social Media Responsibility within the University of Michigan School of Information from the University of Michigan Detroit Center.

In 2017, Gilchrist ran for Detroit City Clerk against incumbent Janice Winfrey. He lost by 1,482 votes.

Gilchrist was selected as a Community Change Champion in Community Organizing in 2019 for his work to advance social and racial justice in the United States.

Lieutenant governor of Michigan 

Gretchen Whitmer selected Gilchrist as her running mate in the 2018 Michigan gubernatorial election. The pair defeated the Republican ticket of Bill Schuette and Lisa Posthumus Lyons. With Whitmer's victory, Gilchrist became the first African American to serve as the lieutenant governor of Michigan, as well as the first born in the 1980's. He took office on January 1, 2019.

On April 9, 2020, Whitmer named Gilchrist as the chair of a statewide taskforce examining racial disparities in the COVID-19 pandemic. Gilchrist later claimed victory in reducing the racial disparities in COVID-19 deaths, but according to public health experts this change in racial disparities in COVID-19 deaths may be due to a surge in cases among white people living around the state.

Gilchrist was named a vice-chair of the 2020 Democratic National Convention. 

On November 8, 2022, Whitmer and Gilchrist were re-elected by a wide margin in 2022 Michigan gubernatorial election, defeating the Republican ticket of Tudor Dixon and Shane Hernandez.

Personal life
Gilchrist and his wife have three children.

Electoral history

See also 
 List of minority governors and lieutenant governors in the United States

References

External links

Government website

1982 births
Living people
African-American people in Michigan politics
Computer engineers
Lieutenant Governors of Michigan
Michigan Democrats
Politicians from Detroit
University of Michigan College of Engineering alumni
21st-century American politicians
American software engineers
21st-century American engineers
Engineers from Michigan
African-American engineers
African-American businesspeople
21st-century American businesspeople
Businesspeople from Michigan
People from Farmington, Michigan
Activists from Michigan
African-American activists
21st-century African-American politicians
20th-century African-American people